"Put In Work" is a song by American R&B singer Jacquees, featuring American R&B singer Chris Brown. It was released on July 23, 2020 as the lead single from Jacquees's upcoming third studio album. The song was written by Jacquees and Brown, and produced by OG Parker and XL Eagle.

Composition 
"Put in Work" is an R&B mid-tempo song written entirely by Jacquees and Brown, and produced by XL Eagle and OG Parker. Jacquees sings the verses and Brown performs the chorus, divided into a first part rapped and a second R&B melodic part.

The song was anticipated on June 8, 2020 via producer OG Parker's Instagram profile, in a short video featuring him and Brown in the studio listening to the song.

Music video 
The music video for the single was released on the day the song was released. The video was shot in Los Angeles, mainly at Brown's house and its surroundings, with some scenes shot in the singer's Lamborghini.

Charts

References

2020 singles
2020 songs
Jacquees songs
Chris Brown songs
Songs written by Chris Brown
Cash Money Records singles
Republic Records singles